Admiral Ballard may refer to:

George Alexander Ballard (1862–1948), British Royal Navy admiral
Samuel James Ballard (1765–1829), British Royal Navy vice admiral
Volant Vashon Ballard (1774–1832), British Royal Navy rear admiral